Guruvayur is a municipal temple town in Thrissur District, of Kerala State in India. It houses the Guruvayur Shri Krishna Temple.

Etymology
According to Hindu legend, the deity Krishna is said to have asked a deity and a sage to take the idol from his temple in Dvaraka before it was destroyed by a flood, and establish it in Kerala. Accordingly, the idol of Krishna is believed to have been brought by the wind deity Vayu and Sage Brihaspati and was placed in Guruvayur. The name Guruvayur is a portmanteau of their names: Guru referring to the title of Brihaspati, Vayu referring to the deity. Ur is a Malayalam suffix that means city or settlement.

Demographics
In 2010, the Municipality has been upgraded to Grade 1 by merging adjoining nearby Pookode and Thaikkad panchayats. The Municipality consists of Perakam (CT) village, Pookode Village, Iringappuram(CT) Village , Thaikkad(CT) Village, Chavakkad Village, and Guruvayur Village part, revenue villages of Chavakkad Taluk.  Thus the Municipality total area is 29.66 square kilometers, total number of wards (43), population (67,006) and population density (2,259 per square kilometer) are changed.

Government
In 2010, the electoral wards were increased to 43. Guruvayur is a Grade-1 Municipality. Guruvayur assembly constituency is part of Trichur (Lok Sabha constituency).

Festivals

Guruvayur Ekadashi
Ekadashi, the eleventh day of every lunar fortnight, is very auspicious to the Hindus. Of the 24 Ekadashis in a year, the Vrishchika Ekadashi (Sukla paksha) has got special significance in Guruvayur temple. A memorial honour for Gajarajan Keshavan is conducted in Guruvayur. The Karanavar or head of the elephant family places a wreath at the statue of Keshavan in front of Sreevalsam guest house and all the other elephants stand around and pay obeisance. On Ekadashi day, the Udayasthamana Pooja (dawn to dusk pooja) is conducted by the Devaswom itself . After the morning seeveli, on Ekadashi there is a grand elephant procession to the Parthasarathi temple since it is regarded as Geethopadesam Day also. On Ekadashi after night pooja, the famous Ekadashi Vilakku with elephant procession takes place and provides a fitting finale to the festival.

Chembai Sangeetholsavam

Chembai Sangeetholsavam is an annual Carnatic music festival held in Guruvayur by the Guruvayur Devaswom as a kind of homage to Chembai Vaidyanatha Bhagavatar, one of the titans of Carnatic Classical Music. Chembai had conducted the festival in the temple town on his own for about 60 years. He used to invite all the great Carnatic Musicians to perform in the temple town and in course of time, the scale of the festival rivalled the Thyagaraja Aradhana at Thiruvaiyaru, which is recognised as one of the most important festivals of homage paid to Saint Thyagaraja.

The Guruvayur Devaswom decided to take charge after his death in 1974, and renamed it as Chembai Sangeetholsavam in his memory. About 2000-2500 musicians participate in this festival every year, and it is held for about 12–15 days culminating on the Guruvayur Ekadashi day, when all the musicians sing 5 favourite songs of Chembai and also the Pancharatna Kritis of Thyagaraja.

Notable landmarks

Guruvayur Temple

The Guruvayur Temple is a famous Krishna temple and is an important regional place of worship for Hindus. It is often referred to as Bhuloka Vaikuntham, which translates to the holy abode of Vishnu on earth. The idol installed here represents a form of the deity Vishnu bearing four arms carrying the conch Panchajanya, the discus Sudarshana Chakra, the mace Kaumodaki, and the lotus. Adorned with a tulasi garland, the idol represents Vishnu as revealed to Vasudeva and Devaki at the time of his incarnation of Krishna. The presiding deity in the sanctum sanctorum is Vishnu. He faces east and his idol is 4 feet tall. Even though this is not a much small idol, devotees consider him as Balakrishna. He is worshipped according to the puja routines laid down by Adi Sankaracharya and later written formally in the Tantric way by Chennas Narayanan Namboodiri (born in 1427). The Chennas Namboodiris are the hereditary Tantris of the Guruvayur temple. There are sub-shrines for Ganesha, Ayyappan, and Bhagavati inside the complex, and also two shrines for Ganesha and serpent deities under the temple outside the complex.

Other
 Punnathur Kotta Elephant sanctuary
 Mammiyoor Temple
 Krishnanattam

Transport

Road
Guruvayur can be accessed from Kochi city by National Highway NH 66, which starts from Edapally in Kochi and interchange from Chavakkad. Guruvayur can be accessed from Thrissur city by state highway 49, which starts from Guruvayur and ends in state highway 69 at Choondal. Guruvayur can be accessed from Kozhikkode city by Chamravattom, interchange from Chavakkad. SH50 connecting chavakkad Kunnamkulam and wadakkancheri passes through Mammiyur Junction at Guruvayur. SH60 starting from Guruvayur ends at Ponnani the norther town to Guruvayur. From Guruvayur there are regular State-owned Kerala State Road Transport Corporation (KSRTC) buses. There is  a KSRTC Kerala State Road Transport Corporation bus stand in Guruvayur which run inter-state, inter-district and city services. There are good frequency of buses from Palakkad, Calicut also

Railway
The main rail transport system in Guruvayur is operated by the Southern Railway Zone of Indian Railways. Guruvayur Railway Station lies in the Thrissur-Guruvayur Section. It is the last station in this section. There are two passenger trains operating from Guruvayur Railway Station to Ernakulam Junction and another two passenger trains to Thrissur railway station every day. An overnight express train to Chennai Egmore via Ernakulam Junction, Kollam Junction, Thiruvananthapuram, Nagercoil Junction, Madurai, Trichy is also running from Guruvayur Railway Station every day. Thrissur railway station is the major rail head near to Guruvayur from where you can get all South Indian and North Indian trains.

Air
All international, domestic and chartered flights are available here.

Climate

Education
 Sree Krishna College, Guruvayur
 Little Flower College

References

External links

Guruvayoor Municipality 
guruvayuronline.com - Divine Gateway
guruvayurdevaswom.org 
Read the details about Sri Guruvayoor Temple

 
Cities and towns in Thrissur district
Kathakali